The Congregation of the Sisters of Charity of Jesus and Mary is a Roman Catholic religious institute founded in Ghent, Belgium. An enclosed religious order, its main apostolate is helping the needy and the sick, inspired by the work of Saint Vincent de Paul and Saint Bernard of Clairvaux.

Their traditional habit, in the Cistercian tradition, was a white tunic with a black veil and scapular.

The Superior General of the order is Sr. Lucy Jacob Palliampallithara, who is based in the global headquarters in Brussels, Belgium.

History
On 4 November 1803, the Congregation was founded by the Rev. Canon Peter Joseph Triest, the pastor of Lovendegem at that time. Triest, who was to found two other religious institutes for the relief of the poor, recruited a group of young women, from among whom the co-foundress Mother Placida van der Gauwen came. Mother Placida later became the first Mother Superior of the congregation.

In the late 19th century, they established missions in the Belgian Congo (1892), British Ceylon (1896) and British India (1897). They were also invited to open a house in England by Cardinal Herbert Vaughan.

In popular culture 
From this congregation came Marie Louise Habets (Sister Xaverine), who served as the basis for Sister Luke / Gabrielle Van der Mal, the protagonist of the 1956 Kathryn Hulme novel The Nun's Story. Her character was later portrayed by Audrey Hepburn in the 1959 film adaptation of the book.

See also

 Religious congregation
 Institute of consecrated life
 Religious institute

References

External links
 International website of the Sisters of Charity of Jesus and Mary
 Sisters of Charity of Jesus and Mary in ODIS - Online Database for Intermediary Structures

Religious institutes in the Vincentian tradition
Catholic nursing orders
Catholic religious institutes established in the 19th century
Catholic female orders and societies
1803 establishments in Europe
Lovendegem